The meridian 140° east of Greenwich is a line of longitude that extends from the North Pole across the Arctic Ocean, Asia, the Pacific Ocean, Australasia, the Indian Ocean, the Southern Ocean, and Antarctica to the South Pole.

The 140th meridian east forms a great circle with the 40th meridian west.

From Pole to Pole
Starting at the North Pole and heading south to the South Pole, the 140th meridian east passes through:

{| class="wikitable plainrowheaders"
! scope="col" width="130" | Co-ordinates
! scope="col" | Country, territory or sea
! scope="col" | Notes
|-
| style="background:#b0e0e6;" | 
! scope="row" style="background:#b0e0e6;" | Arctic Ocean
| style="background:#b0e0e6;" |
|-
| 
! scope="row" | 
| Sakha Republic — Kotelny Island, New Siberian Islands
|-
| style="background:#b0e0e6;" | 
! scope="row" style="background:#b0e0e6;" | Laptev Sea
| style="background:#b0e0e6;" |
|-
| 
! scope="row" | 
| Sakha Republic — Great Lyakhovsky Island, New Siberian Islands
|-
| style="background:#b0e0e6;" | 
! scope="row" style="background:#b0e0e6;" | Laptev Sea
| style="background:#b0e0e6;" |
|-valign="top"
| 
! scope="row" | 
| Sakha Republic Khabarovsk Krai — from 
|-
| style="background:#b0e0e6;" | 
! scope="row" style="background:#b0e0e6;" | Sea of Okhotsk
| style="background:#b0e0e6;" |
|-
| 
! scope="row" | 
| Khabarovsk Krai
|-
| style="background:#b0e0e6;" | 
! scope="row" style="background:#b0e0e6;" | Sea of Japan
| style="background:#b0e0e6;" |
|-valign="top"
| 
! scope="row" | 
| Island of Hokkaidō— Hokkaidō Prefecture
|-
| style="background:#b0e0e6;" | 
! scope="row" style="background:#b0e0e6;" | Sea of Japan
| style="background:#b0e0e6;" |
|-valign="top"
| 
! scope="row" | 
| Island of Hokkaidō— Hokkaidō Prefecture
|-
| style="background:#b0e0e6;" | 
! scope="row" style="background:#b0e0e6;" | Sea of Japan
| style="background:#b0e0e6;" |
|-valign="top"
| 
! scope="row" | 
| Island of Honshū— Aomori Prefecture— Akita Prefecture — from 
|-
| style="background:#b0e0e6;" | 
! scope="row" style="background:#b0e0e6;" | Sea of Japan
| style="background:#b0e0e6;" |
|-valign="top"
| 
! scope="row" | 
| Island of Honshū— Akita Prefecture— Yamagata Prefecture — from — Fukushima Prefecture — from — Tochigi Prefecture — from — Ibaraki Prefecture — from — Chiba Prefecture — from 
|-
| style="background:#b0e0e6;" | 
! scope="row" style="background:#b0e0e6;" | Tokyo Bay
| style="background:#b0e0e6;" |
|-valign="top"
| 
! scope="row" | 
| Island of Honshū— Chiba Prefecture (Bōsō Peninsula)
|-valign="top"
| style="background:#b0e0e6;" | 
! scope="row" style="background:#b0e0e6;" | Pacific Ocean
| style="background:#b0e0e6;" | Passing just east of the island of Hachijōjima, Tokyo Prefecture,  (at ) Passing just east of the island of Aogashima, Tokyo Prefecture,  (at ) Passing through the Bayonnaise Rocks, Tokyo Prefecture,  (at ) Passing just west of Smith Island, Tokyo Prefecture,  (at ) Passing just west of Tori Shima, Tokyo Prefecture,  (at ) Passing just east of Ulithi Atoll,  (at )
|-
| 
! scope="row" | 
| Forms the northern half of the Indonesia–Papua New Guinea border on the island of New Guinea
|-
| style="background:#b0e0e6;" | 
! scope="row" style="background:#b0e0e6;" | Arafura Sea
| style="background:#b0e0e6;" |
|-
| style="background:#b0e0e6;" | 
! scope="row" style="background:#b0e0e6;" | Gulf of Carpentaria
| style="background:#b0e0e6;" |
|-valign="top"
| 
! scope="row" | 
| Queensland South Australia — from 
|-
| style="background:#b0e0e6;" | 
! scope="row" style="background:#b0e0e6;" | Indian Ocean
| style="background:#b0e0e6;" | Australian authorities consider this to be part of the Southern Ocean
|-
| style="background:#b0e0e6;" | 
! scope="row" style="background:#b0e0e6;" | Southern Ocean
| style="background:#b0e0e6;" |
|-
| 
! scope="row" | Antarctica
| Adélie Land, claimed by 
|-
|}

Japan

Gallery

See also
139th meridian east
141st meridian east

References

e140 meridian east